The UEFA European Championship is one of the major competitive international football tournaments, first played in 1960, whose finals stage has been held every four years, with the sixteenth staging of the competition occurring in 2021 (postponed for a year due to the COVID-19 pandemic in Europe).

The Sweden national football team did not enter the competition until 1992 when it was the host nation of the tournament. However, Sweden has only qualified every time since the 2000 edition (played in Belgium and the Netherlands), having missed out the 1996 edition. The team's best performance has been reaching the semi-finals once — in 1992, losing to Germany 2–3 to finish with a bronze medal, Sweden's highest achievement up to date in the European Championship.

Overall record

*Draws include knockout matches decided via penalty shoot-out.
**Gold background colour indicates that the tournament was won.
''***Red border colour indicates that the tournament was held on home soil.

Euro 1992

Group stage

Knockout stage

Semi-finals

Euro 2000

Group stage

Euro 2004

Group stage

Knockout stage

Quarter-finals

Euro 2008

Group stage

Euro 2012

Group stage

Euro 2016

Group stage

Euro 2020

Group stage

Knockout phase

Round of 16

Goalscorers

Notes

References

 
Countries at the UEFA European Championship